Smithville is an unincorporated community and census-designated place (CDP) located within Galloway Township, in Atlantic County, New Jersey, United States, that was established as part of the 2010 United States Census. As of the 2010 Census, the CDP's population was 7,242.

Although Smithville has existed as a community since the American Revolutionary War, most of the community remained very rural until the 1960s when the Smithville Towne Center, a tourist attraction containing over 80 shops, opened. The Towne Center was expanded to include numerous rides and other shops named "The Village Greene", which was the centerpiece of a large planned community developed since the 1980s.

History
It is in the Smithville in Atlantic County that James Baremore built what is now the Smithville Inn in 1787, a single room along a well-traveled stagecoach route. However, historians debate whether it was originally planned as an inn.  The area of Smithville was originally considered part of Leeds / Leeds Point at the time. By 1874 the inn had grown to six times its original size. Its success was well established, but it was eventually abandoned at the turn of the 1900s. In 1952, Ethel and Fred Noyes purchased the inn and restored the building, opening it as a restaurant with 42 seats.

Later history
Around the 1960s, Ethel and Fred Noyes decided to expand the site into a historical attraction, similar to Colonial Williamsburg. Several historic buildings from around South Jersey were brought to the site, restored, and converted into shops and attractions.

In 1990, the newly formed Smithville Development Company began construction on the second part of the Smithville Towne Center, named "The Village Greene", which includes more stores and other activities, such as paddleboats, miniature golf, a carousel, an old-fashioned steam train, and several other attractions. In addition to The Village Greene, the company embarked on a Planned Unit Development containing 6,800 condominium units. Due to legal disagreements, the number of units was reduced to 4,000. Soon after, a recession forced the construction to stop in 1991, leaving around 1,600 completed units. In 1995, the remaining land was sold to KHovnanian of Red Bank. KHovnanian reduced the number of planned residences from 2,500 condominium units to a 1200-unit retirement community. The project was later renamed "Four Seasons at Historic Smithville", which was built in several phases.

Geography
According to the United States Census Bureau, Smithville had a total area of 5.055 square miles (13.091 km2), including 5.001 square miles (12.952 km2) of land and 0.054 square miles (0.139 km2) of water (1.06%).

Smithville is located in the New Jersey Pine Barrens.

Demographics

Census 2010

Transportation

Smithville is accessible via exit 48 of the Garden State Parkway (southbound only) by way of U.S. Route 9 (New York Road) and via exit 44 of the Garden State Parkway (northbound), by following Moss Mill Road (County Route 561 Alternate) east/south.

New Jersey Transit provides bus service to Atlantic City on the 559 route.

Notable people

People who were born in, residents of, or otherwise closely associated with Smithville include:
 Enoch Johnson or "Nucky" Johnson was born in Smithville, although he was most associated with Atlantic City.
 Mushond Lee (born 1970), actor who appeared on The Cosby Show and in the film Lean on Me

References

External links

Historic Smithville & Village Green website
Smithville History and Information
Shoobees Guide to Smithville

Census-designated places in Atlantic County, New Jersey
Galloway Township, New Jersey
Populated places in the Pine Barrens (New Jersey)
Planned communities in the United States
Retirement communities
Tourist attractions in Atlantic County, New Jersey